Khalid Al-Kulaibi (born May 2, 1986) is an Omani swimmer, who specialized in sprint freestyle and open water marathon. He represented Oman, as a 14-year-old, at the 2000 Summer Olympics, and later became an open water swimmer at the 2011 FINA World Championships.

Al-Kulaibi competed only in the men's 50 m freestyle at the 2000 Summer Olympics in Sydney. He received a ticket from FINA, under a Universality program, in an entry time of 26.96. Swimming in heat two, he edged out Laos' Sikhounxay Ounkhamphanyavong on the final stretch to save a seventh seed by 0.07 of a second in 26.96. Al-Kulaibi failed to advance into the semifinals, as he placed sixty-eighth overall out of 80 swimmers in the prelims.

Eleven years after his Olympic stint, Al-Kulaibi qualified for his Omani team, as a 25-year-old open water swimmer, at the 2011 FINA World Championships in Shanghai, China. He placed forty-first in the 5 km race with a scintillating time of 1:02:14.8, sufficiently enough for his personal best.

References

External links
 

1986 births
Living people
Omani male swimmers
Olympic swimmers of Oman
Swimmers at the 2000 Summer Olympics
Omani male freestyle swimmers
Male long-distance swimmers
People from Muscat, Oman
20th-century Omani people
21st-century Omani people